This list of presidential elections in the Philippines includes election results of both presidential and vice presidential elections since 1899 with the candidates' political party and their corresponding percentage.

The offices of the president and vice president are elected separately; hence a voter may split their vote. The candidate with the highest number of votes wins the position.

There had been 17 direct presidential elections in history: 1897, 1935, 1941, 1946, 1949, 1953, 1957, 1961, 1965, 1969, 1981, 1986, 1992, 1998, 2004, 2010, 2016 and 2022. When referring to "presidential elections", these 17 are usually the ones being referred to. All of these also included vice presidential elections, except for 1981.

There had also been two indirect elections: 1899 and 1943. Both were elected by the legislature (The Malolos Congress in 1899 and the National Assembly in 1943), and both resulted in unanimous and uncontested votes.

There had been two presidential referendums, in July 1973 and 1977. All in all, there had been 21 presidential ballots in Philippine history.

Since 1992, the elections have been held on the second Monday of May and every six years thereafter. The next presidential and vice presidential elections are in May 2028.

History
During the Philippine Revolution, several leadership elections for the Katipunan were later on described as precursors of presidential elections. One example of this is the Tejeros Convention of 1897, where Emilio Aguinaldo successfully removed erstwhile Katipunan leader Andres Bonifacio. From that point on, it was Aguinaldo who would lead the revolution, declare independence from Spain, and convened the Malolos Congress. The Malolos Congress elected Aguinaldo as president on January 1, 1899, passed a constitution on January 22, and Aguinaldo and the First Republic was inaugurated on January 23, 1899. The First Republic existed until Aguinaldo's capture by the Americans on March 23, 1901.

The first presidential election by popular vote was on September 15, 1935, after the ratification of the 1935 Constitution of the Philippines; Manuel Quezon of the Nacionalista Party emerged as the victor, defeating previous president Emilio Aguinaldo (Aguinaldo was elected president by the Malolos Congress). As a commonwealth then of the United States, the constitution decreed that the president shall have one term of six years without reelection. In 1940, it was amended to allow one reelection, but with the term shortened to four years; this setup was first used in the second election in 1941 with Quezon being reelected.

However, World War II intervened and thus suspended the elections of 1945. The Empire of Japan set up the Second Philippine Republic that elected José P. Laurel as president by the National Assembly in 1943. After the Japanese were defeated, Congress rescheduled the much-delayed election in 1946. Manuel Roxas of the newly formed Liberal Party won the election a few weeks prior to the granting of independence by the United States. In 1949, the first election for the newly independent republic was held with President Elpidio Quirino winning; Quirino succeeded Roxas, who died while in office. Thereafter, elections were held every four years every second Tuesday of November of the election year, with the winning president and vice president inaugurated on December 30 succeeding the election. The alternation between the Nacionalistas and the Liberals characterized an apparent two-party system of the Third Republic.

In the operation of the 1935 constitution, there were nine presidential elections; excluding the first election where there were no incumbents, the incumbent was beaten four times (1946, 1953, 1961, 1965), the incumbent won upon ascending to the presidency from a vacancy twice (1949, 1957), and two incumbents won a second term after being elected to a first term as president (1941, 1969).

In 1972, President Ferdinand Marcos declared martial law and ruled by decree. At this time, a new constitution was ratified in 1973 in which the office of the vice president being abolished. and that the president shall be elected by the National Assembly amongst themselves, although once elected, the president will cease to be a member of the National Assembly and any political party (similar to the British Speaker of the House of Commons). With the members of the National Assembly having no term limits, the president may serve indefinitely. Before parliament was elected referendums in 1973 and 1977 affirmed that Marcos will stay as president and prime minister even after parliament has been organized.

In 1981, via constitutional amendment, the president is again elected via popular vote, with a term of office of six years starting at the thirtieth of June of the year of the election. In the succeeding election on June 16, 1981 (third Monday of June); Marcos was again elected, with much of the opposition boycotting the election. In addition, the amendment also renamed the National Assembly into its Filipino translation as "Batasang Pambansa." In 1984, another amendment reinstated the office of the vice president. The election of the vice president is similar to the United States presidential election, in which a vote for the president is also a vote for the vice president, although this was later changed to a separate vote for each position. Marcos' Kilusang Bagong Lipunan (New Society Movement or KBL) won every presidential election of the Fourth Republic until 1986.

In 1986, Marcos called for an early or "snap" election (the next scheduled election was in 1987) and was, including his running mate Arturo Tolentino, declared the winners. The People Power Revolution erupted that drove Marcos out of power, and Corazon Aquino, the runner-up, assumed the presidency. A new constitution was ratified in 1987 that was essentially identical with the provisions of the amended 1973 constitution as long as the election of the president and vice president is concerned, with the presidential election occurring at the second Monday of May and the inauguration every June 30 of the election year. The 1992 election was the first election under the new constitution and elections are held every six years thereafter. Fidel V. Ramos won the 1992 election with just 23% of the vote, the lowest plurality in history; it also ushered in the multi-party system of the Fifth Republic. Thereafter, no winner has won via a majority, although each has had an increasing percentage of votes with every succeeding election. Joseph Estrada won in 1998 in what was described as landslide, getting just under 40% of the votes, while second place Jose de Venecia getting 16%. President Gloria Macapagal Arroyo, who succeeded Estrada at the outcome of the 2001 EDSA Revolution, was the first sitting president to run, and defeated Fernando Poe, Jr. in the closest margin in history. Benigno Aquino III won in 2010 with 42% of the vote in what was also called as a landslide, defeating Estrada who had 26% of the vote, and seven others. Rodrigo Duterte won with just under 40% of the vote, but with a 14% margin of victory from second-placer Mar Roxas in 2016. In the 2022 election, under the Partido Federal ng Pilipinas (PFP), Bongbong Marcos won by a landslide and received nearly 59% of the votes, becoming the first to be elected by a majority since the establishment of the Fifth Republic in 1986.

In the operation of the 1987 constitution, incumbents who have in office for more than four years are barred to defend their seats, but all but one (1992) candidate endorsed by the incumbent lost, and one defended the seat after ascending to the presidency (2004).

Summary

Results summary 
 Boldface: Incumbent
 Italics: Nominee of the ruling party, or supported by the incumbent
Only candidates from third parties whose votes surpassed the margin between the winner and the best loser are included.

For president

For vice president

Graphical

For president

For vice president

Incumbent president running for re-election
Based on the 1935 constitution, from 1935 to 1940, the incumbent president is eligible for one six-year term and cannot be reelected.

In 1940, a plebiscite approved an amendment that set a four-year term for a president, and that a president can be re-elected, but cannot serve for more than an amount of time that is worth two full terms (eight years).

In 1973, a plebiscite adopted a new constitution that abolished term limits, and set up a six-year term for the president.

In 1987, a plebiscite approved a new constitution that set a six-year term with no reelection for the incumbent. A vice president who became president cannot be elected as president if that person served as president for more than four years. As the incumbent president at that time was elected under the 1973 constitution, she was allowed to run anew but chose not to.

Every president who is eligible to run for president ran again, except in 1992 where Corazon Aquino did not run.

Vice presidents who became president upon vacancy of the latter office ran four times, and won as presidents in their own right in 1949, 1957 and 2004, and lost In 1946.

Incumbent vice president running for president 
In 1946, 1949 and 1957, no vice president was in office due to the erstwhile officeholder becoming president upon death of the president, and that there was no constitutional mechanism to fill up the office upon vacancy.

In 1981, the constitution had by then abolished the office of the vice president. It was reinstated upon a plebiscite in 1984, and the vice presidency was first elected in 1986.

Five vice presidents ran for the presidency after their vice presidential term ended. Two of them won, in 1961, beating the incumbent president, and in 1998. Three of them, in 1992, 2016, and 2022 lost. Two vice presidents ran for another office after their vice presidential term ended; both won: in 1953, the vice president ran and won for senator, finishing first, and in 1965 where the vice president ran for a seat in the House of Representatives. Two vice presidents defended the seat, with both succeeding in 1941 and 1969. Two vice presidents did not pursue other office after their vice presidential term ended.

Regional trends

Regional corridors
Political strategists have divided the country into several "corridors" that replicate or combine administrative regions, which in turn are mostly based from the main ethnic groups. In 1992, prior to the 1992 election, Luis Villafuerte outlined several "corridors" throughout the country, from north to south:

Metro Manila as an opposition stronghold
Manila, and by extension, Metro Manila when it was created in 1975, has voted for the opposition candidate (or the opponent(s) of the incumbent's party) in the election.

This became apparent in the 1935 election, where it was thought that the opponents of the Nacionalista candidates (as this was the first election, the Nacionalistas were the ruling party of the insular territory) would beat them in Manila. The Nacionalistas still prevailed.

Bellwether provinces

Since the creation of the province of Basilan, the province has always had the provincial winner be elected President. The national winner has always been the winner in Negros Oriental except in 1961 and 2016.

After the losing candidate won in Negros Oriental in 2016, the longest streak belongs to Agusan del Norte which had its provincial winner follow the national winner since the 1969 election; Lanao del Sur broke its streak when the losing candidate won there in 2022.

Home province as a stronghold
Candidates usually win their home provinces. and by extension, region, except when the province has two or more candidates as residents.

President
Bolded name indicates the national winner.

Vice president

Results by popular vote margin

For president

For vice president

Results per election

1899 

Emilio Aguinaldo was unanimously elected and voted president by the Malolos Congress on January 1, 1899. He was inaugurated on January 23, along with the First Philippine Republic.

1935

In the first presidential election by popular vote, Quezon defeated former president Aguinaldo and Philippine Independent Church Supreme Bishop Gregorio Aglipay.

For President

For Vice President

1941

President Quezon and Vice President Sergio Osmeña resoundingly defeated their opponents to stay in office.

For President

For Vice President

1943 

Jose P. Laurel was elected president unopposed by the National Assembly on September 25, 1943.

1946

In 1944, President Quezon died, thereby Vice President Osmeña succeeded him as president. By 1946, the ruling Nacionalista Party was split into two, with its liberal wing putting up its own candidate for president in the person of Manuel Roxas. Roxas defeated Osmeña in the election. Roxas's running mate Elpidio Quirino defeated Eulogio Rodriguez to win the vice presidency.

For President

For Vice President

1949

President Roxas died in 1948. Vice President Elpidio Quirino succeeded him, and was elected president on his own right in 1949. His runnin running mate, senator Fernando Lopez won the vice presidential election.

For President

For Vice President

1953

President Quirino was defeated by former Secretary of Defense Ramon Magsaysay in 1953 in a record margin post-independence. His running mate, senator Carlos P. Garcia also resoundingly defeated his opponent.

For President

For Vice President

1957

President Magsaysay died in 1957 a few months before the election. His Vice President, Carlos P. Garcia succeeded him, and was elected president on his own right later that year. The opposition won the vice presidency, with Diosdado Macapagal defeating Jose Laurel Jr.

For President

For Vice President

1961

President Garcia was defeated by Vice President Diosdado Macapagal. This was the only election where the two top office-holders faced each other for the presidency. Macapagal's running mate Emmanuel Pelaez kept the vice presidency under the Liberal Party's hands.

For President

For Vice President

1965

President Macapagal got the nomination of the Liberal Party. This led to Senator Ferdinand Marcos to abandon the party in favor of the Nacionalistas. Marcos and his running mate former vice president Fernando Lopez defeated President Macapagal and Gerardo Roxas in the election.

For President

For Vice President

1969

President Marcos became the first president to defend the presidency on his first full term in 1969. Vice president Lopez won an unprecedented third vice presidential term.

For President

For Vice President

1973 martial law referendum 

By 1972, President Marcos declared martial law. A year later, a plebiscite approved a new constitution that allowed the president to stay in power beyond 1973 as allowed by the previous (1935) constitution. A few months after that, another referendum asked voters if they wanted Marcos to stay in power beyond 1973:

1977 presidential referendum 

In 1977, a referendum approved Marcos staying as president after the Interim Batasang Pambansa was organized a year later.

1981

In 1981, President Marcos won in an election that was boycotted by much of the opposition. His winning margin is a record, and his vote total has not been matched to date in a single-winner election.

1986

In 1986, President Marcos called for a special presidential election. He was proclaimed winner despite allegations of massive fraud, but was ousted by the People Power Revolution weeks later. The revolution installed Marcos's opponent, Corazon Aquino, as president and her running mate Salvador Laurel, as vice president.

For President

For Vice President

1992

Prior to the election, President Aquino announced that she won't be running, anointing Speaker Ramon Mitra Jr. as her preferred successor. She later changed her mind, and picked Secretary of Defense Fidel V. Ramos instead. Ramos narrowly defeated Agrarian Reform Secretary Miriam Defensor Santiago, who alleged fraud, Mitra and four others.

Josepoh Estrada, who initially ran for president, slid down to become the vice presidential running mate of Danding Cojuangco and won.

For President

For Vice President

1998

President Ramos handpicked Speaker Jose de Venecia Jr. as his preferred successor. He was defeated by Vice President Joseph Estrada who had a healthy lead against de Venecia. In the vice presidential election, senator Gloria Macapagal Arroyo also had a clear advantage over Estrada's running mate senator Edgardo Angara.

For President

For Vice President

2004

In 2001, President Estrada was ousted via the 2001 EDSA Revolution due to massive corruption. Vice President Gloria Macapagal Arroyo succeeded him and was elected president on her own right in 2004 against Estrada's friend Fernando Poe Jr. Poe died later that year, and by 2005, the Hello Garci scandal erupted where Arroyo was seen to have benefitted from massive cheating in the election.

Senator Noli de Castro narrowly defeated senator Loren Legarda, who also alleged cheating.

For President

For Vice President

2010

Approaching the 2010 election, President Arroyo was deeply unpopular. Her Lakas Kampi CMD party nominated Secretary of Defense Gilbert Teodoro, but rumors persisted that she wanted Senator Manuel Villar to succeed her. In 2009, former president Aquino died, catapulting her son Senator Benigno Aquino III in the presidential race. Aquino defeated former president Estrada, Villar, Teodoro and several others in the election.

Estrada's running mate Makati mayor Jejomar Binay narrowly defeated senator Mar Roxas, the initial presidential nominee who slid down for Aquino.

For President

For Vice President

2016

In 2016, President Aquino's Liberal Party nominated former Secretary of the Interior and Local Government Mar Roxas (President Roxas's grandson) as their presidential candidate. Roxas had previously gave way to Aquino in 2010. Davao City Mayor Rodrigo Duterte had previously denied running for president, only to have him substituted as PDP-Laban's candidate. Duterte defeated Roxas and three others in the election.

In the vice presidential election, House Representative from Camarines Sur Leni Robredo narrowly defeated senator Bongbong Marcos.

For President

For Vice President

2022 
The ruling PDP–Laban was split into two factions heading into the election. The titular head of one faction, president Rodrigo Duterte, pushed for the presidential ticket of senator Bong Go and himself. Another faction pushed for the presidential candidacy of senator Manny Pacquiao. In the end, neither faction using the "PDP–Laban" label to avoid complications, with Bong Go ultimately withdrawing as a presidential candidate of Pederalismo ng Dugong Dakilang Samahan. Sara Duterte, the president's daughter, then ran as the vice presidential running mate of Bongbong Marcos, while the Liberal Party-led opposition chose vice president Leni Robredo as its standard bearer.

The Marcos–Duterte ticket won in a landslide, and the first majority mandates in the Fifth Republic era.

For President

For Vice President

Results per province/city

References 

Elections in the Philippines
Philippines politics-related lists